Wadakkanchery railway station (station code: WKI) falls between Mulankunnathukavu railway station and Mullurkara railway station in the busy Shoranur–Cochin Harbour section in Thrissur district. Wadakkancherry railway station is operated by the Chennai-headquartered Southern Railways of the Indian Railways. All passenger trains and some express trains stop here.

Major trains
 Kanyakumari Bengaluru Island Express
 Chennai - Alapuzha Express
 Gorakhpur Kochuveli Raptisagar Express
 Korba Trivandrum SF express

See also
Ollur railway station
Punkunnam railway station
Chalakudi railway station
Guruvayur railway station
Mulankunnathukavu railway station
Thrissur Railway Passengers’ Association

References

Railway stations in Thrissur district
Thiruvananthapuram railway division
Thrissur railway station
Thrissur district
Railway stations in Kerala